HaftHoz (Nabovat) square is a shopping center square located in Narmak neighborhood of Tehran, Iran.

HaftHoz is also the name of place located in the Darakeh, in the path of Palangchal.

External links
https://web.archive.org/web/20160825232956/http://www.hafthoz.com/

Neighbourhoods in Tehran